Stéphane Augé (born 6 December 1974 in Pau) is a French former road racing cyclist. Following his career, he worked as a sporting director for UCI Professional Continental team  from 2011 until 2016. While he initially had a contract to ride competitively with them in the 2011 season, he chose instead to retire as a cyclist and fill an opening in the team's management. He was known to be part of the breakaway in every first stage of the Tour de France.

Major results

1999
 1st Stages 2 & 9 Ruban Granitier Breton
2000
 1st Stage 5 Tour du Poitou-Charentes
2001
 3rd Bordeaux–Caudéran
 7th A Travers le Morbihan
2002
 1st Stage 6 Deutschland Tour
 7th Tour de la Somme
2003
 1st  Mountains classification Circuit de la Sarthe
2006
 1st Stage 3 Tour du Limousin
 1st Stage 3 Tour de Pologne
2007
 1st Cholet-Pays de Loire
 8th Paris–Camembert
2008
 1st  Overall Four Days of Dunkirk
1st Stage 1
 1st Stage 7 Deutschland Tour
 5th Road race, National Road Championships
2009
 8th Overall Four Days of Dunkirk
2010
 3rd Grand Prix de Plumelec-Morbihan
 9th Polynormande

Tour de France participation 
2002 - 115th overall; 6th, Stage 8
2003 - DNF
2005 - 121st overall
2006 - 123rd overall
2007 - DNF; Stage 1 Combativity award; Stage 3-4 King of the Mountains leader
2008 - 139th overall
2009 - Stage 6 King of the Mountains leader

References

External links

1974 births
Living people
French male cyclists
Sportspeople from Pau, Pyrénées-Atlantiques
Cyclists from Nouvelle-Aquitaine